James Harris Armstrong (8 March 1904 – 13 April 1971) was an English footballer who played as a centre half.

Born in Lemington, Newcastle-upon-Tyne, Armstrong played as an amateur at Easington Colliery, before turning professional in November 1926 with Clapton Orient. At the end of the 1927–28 season he transferred to Queens Park Rangers, before joining Watford on a free transfer in May 1933. Armstrong made over 200 appearances for Watford in all competitions, scoring twice. He was part of the team that won the 1937 Third Division South Cup under the player-management of Neil McBain. He left the club in 1940, following the suspension of competitive football due to the Second World War.

Following his retirement from professional football, Armstrong worked for Universal Asbestos, and remained in their employment until shortly before his death. He died on 13 April 1971 in Watford, Hertfordshire.

References

1904 births
1971 deaths
Footballers from Newcastle upon Tyne
English footballers
Easington Colliery A.F.C. players
Leyton Orient F.C. players
Queens Park Rangers F.C. players
Watford F.C. players
English Football League players
Association football central defenders